Schlump is a metro station located in Eimsbüttel, Hamburg. It is served by Hamburg U-Bahn lines U2 and U3.

Schlump station opened in 1912 for line U3, and in 1973 for line U2. With a total of five tracks this is a traffic hub.

Trains 
Schlump is served by Hamburg U-Bahn lines U2 and U3.

Gallery

See also 

 List of Hamburg U-Bahn stations

References

External links 

 Line and route network plans at hvv.de 

Hamburg U-Bahn stations in Hamburg
Buildings and structures in Eimsbüttel
U2 (Hamburg U-Bahn) stations
U3 (Hamburg U-Bahn) stations
Railway stations in Germany opened in 1912